Haider Ackermann (born 29 March 1971) is a Colombian-born French designer of ready-to-wear fashion. He lives in Paris.

Early life
Born in Bogotá, Colombia in 1971, Ackermann was adopted at the age of nine months by a French Alsatian family. His adoptive father is a mapmaker. Ackermann spent his childhood in Ethiopia, Chad, Algeria and France before the family moved to the Netherlands when he was twelve.

Career
Inspired by the work of Yves Saint Laurent, Ackermann went to Belgium in 1994 and studied fashion design at the Royal Academy of Fine Arts in Antwerp. He was expelled in 1997 for failing to turn in course assignments.

After five months of internship with John Galliano, Ackermann worked as an assistant to one of his teachers, the Belgian designer Wim Neels. In the following years he worked for various brands, including Bernhard Willhelm and Patrick Van Ommeslaeghe before working as a designer for Mayerline.

In 2001, Ackermann created his own label and presented his first women's wear collection in March 2001 during Paris fashion week. His 2002 collection drew the attention of house Ruffo, premium leather clothing specialist, which hired him to direct the spring-summer collections and autumn-winter 2003 for Ruffo Research. In 2005, he signed with the Belgian group bvba 32 and set up his studio in Paris.

Ackermann was one of the designers approached to succeed Galliano at Dior, after declining the proposed succession of Martin Margiela in 2009. In 2010, Karl Lagerfeld described him as his ideal successor at Chanel, and some commentators called him a "new Yves Saint-Laurent".

Influenced by cultural differences, Ackermann's fashion contrasts and blends dress codes. The simple cuts of his creations are often asymmetric and sewn of different materials, resolutely modern, dynamic and urban areas, using the resources of the high and low culture, developing type clothing streetwear featuring feminine silhouettes sophisticated and refined. His creations have been worn by Tilda Swinton, Timothée Chalamet, Nastya Hevchuk, Penélope Cruz, Victoria Beckham, Janet Jackson and Kanye West.

In 2010, Ackermann launched a one-off menswear collection during the Pitti trade shows in Florence. In June 2013, entrepreneur Anne Chapelle of 32 BVBA fashion house announced that the Ann Demeulemeester and Haider Ackermann labels would be split into two independent companies. Ackermann subsequently launched his first full menswear line that year.

In 2014, Ackermann worked on a Mercedes-Benz campaign with Tilda Swinton.

Ackermann joined Berluti as creative director in September 2016, succeeding Alessandro Sartori and showed his first collection for the label in January 2017. During his tenure, he introduced a more languid, feminine edge into the collections, which were shown on men and women. His role involved not only the full product design, including sporting accessories, but also ad campaigns, image and stores. He also continued to run his own women’s and men’s lines concurrently with his job at Berluti. By March 2018, Ackermann and Berluti parted ways after just three seasons.

In December 2021, Ackermann alongside close collaborator Timothée Chalamet, designed a hoodie with 100% of the proceeds going to French organization Afghanistan Libre, which is centered around preserving the rights of women in Afghanistan.

Awards

References

External links
 
 

1971 births
Living people
French fashion designers
People from Bogotá
Colombian fashion designers
20th-century Colombian male artists
21st-century Colombian male artists
LVMH people